Turanecio is a genus of flowering plants belonging to the family Asteraceae.

Its native range is Turkey to Iran.

Species:
 Turanecio cariensis (Boiss.) Hamzaoglu 
 Turanecio davisii (V.A.Matthews) Hamzaoglu

References

Asteraceae
Asteraceae genera